Kigeh Olya (also Romanized as Kīgeh ʿOlyā; also known as Kīgeh) is a village in Mahru Rural District, Zaz va Mahru District, Aligudarz County, Lorestan Province, Iran. At the 2006 census, its population was 76, in 17 families.

References 

Towns and villages in Aligudarz County